Mimosa turneri, the desert mimosa, is a perennial small- to medium-sized shrub native to the Southern United States and particularly abundant in Texas. In many places it is considered a weed because it can grow invasively in moist soils.

Habitat and ecology
This species grows as a small to medium-sized shrub that is localized on limestone soil that can range from 2200 feet to 4000 feet above sea level in the desert. This plant is deciduous and has a very high heat tolerance, allowing it to grow in very hot deserts. This plant species was a contained species that escaped and became invasive in the Florida, Texas and Mexico regions. These plants live in soil with high alkalinity.

Morphology
The leaves of the desert mimosa resemble the fronds of a fern and consists of many leaflets that grow opposite of each other along the stem. The leaves are known as bipinnate. Leaflets can range from 9 mm to 12 mm and be 1.5 mm wide at its widest point. Each leaf has about 12- 25 leaflets. Flowers are globe like clusters of thin petals. They contain stamens that are double the number of petals or equal which are often twice the lengths of the corolla. Anthers are small and the ovary is sessile.

Usage
The desert mimosa is often used as food for cattle and livestock, as fuel, construction material as well as living fences that grow into barriers in the wild and can be used as decorative fences.

References

External links

turneri